Tanja Mitrevska (born 27 February 1987) is a Macedonian footballer who plays as a defender for the North Macedonia national team.

International career
Mitrevska made her debut for the North Macedonia national team on 19 September 2009, against Slovakia.

References

1987 births
Living people
Women's association football defenders
Macedonian women's footballers
North Macedonia women's international footballers